Mangapwani is a town on the Tanzanian island of Unguja, the main island of Zanzibar.

The town's name means "Arabian Shore" in swahili, a name which probably dates from the black-market slavery days of the 1840s to 1880s. The shoreline here contains numerous caves, some of which were used for holding slaves at that time. Among the caves is a popular attraction, the Coral Cavern, which is located two kilometres south of the town. The caves of Mangapwani were discovered by Joseph Thomas Last, a British explorer and missionary in East African in the 1870's.

Footnotes

References
Finke, J. (2006) The Rough Guide to Zanzibar (2nd edition). New York: Rough Guides.

Villages in Zanzibar